Pelocoris femoratus is a species of creeping water bug in the family Naucoridae. It is found in Central America, North America, and South America.

References

Further reading

External links

 

Articles created by Qbugbot
Insects described in 1820
Naucoridae